Kent Greenfield may refer to:

 Kent Greenfield (law professor), American lawyer
 Kent Greenfield (baseball) (1902–1978), pitcher in Major League Baseball
Kent Roberts Greenfield (1893-1967), American historian